Edward le Despenser ( 1310 – 30 September 1342) was a son of Hugh le Despenser the Younger by his wife Eleanor de Clare. His father, a favourite of Edward II of England, was executed in 1326. Through his mother, he was a great-grandson of Edward I of England.

Early life
Although his exact whereabouts before the execution of his father are unknown, it is believed that he was among the children living with their mother Eleanor during her imprisonment in the Tower of London (November 1326 – February 1328). He was clearly too young to be seen as a threat to Queen Isabella and her lover Roger Mortimer, unlike his older brother, Hugh (who was imprisoned by the two in 1327).

Marriage and children
After coming into his estates in November 1334, he soon married Anne Ferrers of Groby (sister of Henry, Lord Ferrers). They had four surviving sons:

Edward le Despenser, 1st Baron Despenser  (1336–1375); inherited the Despenser estates from his paternal uncle Hugh.
Hugh le Despenser (died 1374), married Alice Hotham, had issue.
Thomas le Despenser
Henry le Despenser, Bishop of Norwich

Later life
Like a few of his brothers, Edward served in Edward III's military campaigns. In 1342, he accompanied his older brother Hugh to mainland Europe. Although they were originally heading for Gascony, they were diverted to Brest to aid King Edward's ally the Countess of Montfort in the Breton Civil War. On 30 September 1342, they helped achieve a victory against the French army at the Battle of Morlaix, but Edward was killed during the fighting.

Ancestry

References

Works cited

 
 
 

1310 births
1342 deaths
Edward